The 1903 North Carolina A&M Aggies football team represented the North Carolina A&M Aggies of North Carolina College of Agriculture and Mechanic Arts during the 1903 college football season. In Art Devlin's second season as head coach, the Aggies achieved a 4–4 record, tallying the most single-season wins in school history and tying the record of most losses The final two wins came on the same day, with a close, 6–5 decision against the South Carolina and a blowout of Richmond, 53–0.  The Aggies outscored their opponents 152 to 74 on the season.

Schedule

References

North Carolina AandM
NC State Wolfpack football seasons
North Carolina AandM Aggies football